Chicago and North Western Railway Passenger Depot may refer to:

 Chicago and North Western Railway Passenger Depot (Green Bay), listed on the National Register of Historic Places in Wisconsin
 Chicago and North Western Railway Passenger Depot in Douglas, Wyoming, listed on the NRHP in Wyoming